The Gold Cobra Tour was a tour by American rap rock band Limp Bizkit, taking place in support of their album Gold Cobra, beginning in 2010. It was the band's first promotional tour for the new album after their original line-up reunion tour in 2009, and their first North American tour since the Results May Vary Tour in 2004.

The tour started with a few warm-up North American festival dates in May 2010, with a full North American leg soon following in July, though this North American leg was soon cancelled due to the band's dislike of theatres and was never rescheduled for in-door venues like promised by the band. The band went on a European leg instead, between August–October 2010.

The band announced a Latin American tour for October–November 2010, though this tour was soon cancelled following Fred Durst hurting his neck. The band resumed the tour in 2011, announcing more European dates for summer 2011, beginning on June 24, 2011, at the Sonisphere Festival in Basel, Switzerland, to coincide with the album's release on June 28, 2011. The European leg, which consists mostly of festival appearances, is the band's first in support of Gold Cobra since its long delayed release in June 2011.

On July 21, 2011, the band is set to start the first Latin American leg in support of Gold Cobra, a rescheduled leg to make-up for the cancelled October–November 2010 tour, though the new tour includes only 7 dates while the original tour was set to include 11 dates. Dates in Ecuador, Venezuela, Colombia and Costa Rica were not rescheduled. In September 2011, a Japan leg was announced. Limp Bizkit would tour Japan on October 14, 15 and 17. The band played at Epicenter 2011 in California in September 2011.

Setlist

Tour dates

Support acts

Antenna (October 7, 2010)
Dope D.O.D. (June 24–July 7, 2011)
Kaizen (October 3, 2010)
2X (July 21, 2011)
La Raza (July 26, 2011)
Nofacez (October 7, 2010)
Buckcherry (July 10, 2010)

Psyko Dalek (August 24–26, 2010; June 24–July 7, 2011)
The Blackout (September 5–27, 2010)
Tihuana (October 22–24, 2010)
...Por Hablar (August 3, 2011)
Twin Atlantic (August 26, 2010)
Слот (October 3, 2010)
Aaron Lewis/Staind (2010)

References 

2010 concert tours
2011 concert tours
Limp Bizkit concert tours